The  is a football stadium in Kashiwa, Chiba, Japan. It serves as the home ground of the J1 League club Kashiwa Reysol. The stadium holds 15,349 people and was built in 1985.

The stadium is owned by Hitachi and also known as Hitachi Kashiwa Stadium (日立柏サッカー場). In February 2018, a naming rights deal was signed and the stadium was renamed Sankyo Frontier Kashiwa Stadium until 2020.

References

External links 
J. League stadium guide

Football venues in Japan
Kashiwa Reysol
Sports venues in Chiba Prefecture
Kashiwa
Sports venues completed in 1985
1985 establishments in Japan